Amyl and the Sniffers are an Australian pub rock and punk rock band based in Melbourne, consisting of vocalist Amy Taylor, drummer Bryce Wilson, guitarist Dec Martens, and bassist Gus Romer. At the ARIA Music Awards of 2019, their self-titled debut record won the Best Rock Album category.

History

2016–2017: Giddy Up and Big Attraction

The band was formed by housemates Taylor, Wilson and Martens and former band member Calum Newton (AKA Candy) in Balaclava, Melbourne. The four wrote, recorded, and released their first EP, Giddy Up, in a span of 12 hours. Calum left the band to pursue solo music and was replaced by Gus Romer. They take their name from the Australian slang for amyl nitrite, also known as poppers. Amy Taylor compared their music to the drug in an interview with Paul Glynn of the BBC: "In Australia we call poppers Amyl. So you sniff it, it lasts for 30 seconds and then you have a headache – and that's what we're like!" Their sound has been compared to 1970s hard rock groups such as Iggy Pop and The Stooges and The Damned. However, Taylor has cited a number of varying influences including Minor Threat, Ceremony, AC/DC, Sleaford Mods, Dolly Parton and Cardi B. A second EP Big Attraction was released in 2017.

2018–present: Amyl and the Sniffers and Comfort to Me
In 2018, the band went into the studio to record their debut album with producer and former Add N to (X) drummer Ross Orton. The result was the self-titled Amyl and the Sniffers, which was released on 24 May 2019 and has received generally positive reviews including a 7.2 from Pitchfork and 4 out of 5 stars from NME and AllMusic. In light of the album's release, Happy Mag placed the band at No. 9 on their list of "The 15 Australian female artists changing the game right now", praising front-woman Amy Taylor for being "one of hardest rocking people on the face of the planet."

At the ARIA Music Awards of 2019, Amyl and the Sniffers won the ARIA Award for Best Rock Album. In February 2020, the self-titled album was nominated for the Australian Music Prize of 2019.

On 7 July 2021, Amyl and the Sniffers announced their second studio album Comfort to Me, alongside lead single "Guided by Angels". Later in July, the band released another single, "Security". Three days prior to the release of the album the band released a final single, "Hertz", alongside a complementary music video. The full Comfort to Me album was initially scheduled for release in early October 2021, but was pushed up and released on 10 September. The album was recorded at Sound Park, in Melbourne.

In June and July 2022, the band opened for Weezer, Fall Out Boy and Green Day on the European leg of the Hella Mega Tour.

Discography

Albums

EPs

Singles

Awards and nominations

AIR Awards
The Australian Independent Record Awards (commonly known informally as AIR Awards) is an annual awards night to recognise, promote and celebrate the success of Australia's Independent Music sector.

! 
|-
| rowspan="2"| 2022
| rowspan="2"| Comfort to Me
| Independent Album of the Year
|  
| rowspan="2"| 
|-
| Best Independent Punk Album or EP
|

ARIA Music Awards
The ARIA Music Awards is an annual awards ceremony that recognises excellence, innovation, and achievement across all genres of Australian music.

! 
|-
| rowspan="2"| 2019
| Amyl and the Sniffers
| Best Rock Album
| 
| rowspan="2"| 
|-
| Amyl and the Sniffers
| Best Cover Art
| 
|-
| rowspan="6"| 2022
| rowspan="3"| Comfort to Me
| Album of the Year
| 
| rowspan="6"| 
|-
| Best Group
| 
|-
| Best Rock Album
| 
|-
| "Hertz" by Amyl and the Sniffers, John Angus Stewart 
| Best Video
| 
|-
| Comfort to Me Tour 2022
| Best Live Act
| 
|-
| Amyl and the Sniffers & Dan Luscombe for Amyl and the Sniffers Comfort to Me
| Producer – Best Produced Album
| 
|-

Australian Music Prize
The Australian Music Prize (the AMP) is an annual award of $30,000 given to an Australian band or solo artist in recognition of the merit of an album released during the year of award. They commenced in 2005.

|-
| 2019
| Amyl and the Sniffers
| Australian Music Prize
| 
|-
| 2021
| Comfort to Me
| Australian Music Prize
|

J Awards
Commencing in 2005, the J Awards are an annual series of Australian music awards that were established by the Australian Broadcasting Corporation's youth-focused radio station Triple J. 

|-
| rowspan="2"| 2021
| Comfort to Me 
| Australian Album of the Year
| 
|-
| Amyl and the Sniffers
| Double J Artist of the Year
| 
|-

Music Victoria Awards
The Music Victoria Awards, are an annual awards night celebrating music from the Australian state of Victoria. They commenced in 2005.

|-
| Music Victoria Awards of 2017
| Amyl and the Sniffers
| Best Emerging Act
| 
|-
| Music Victoria Awards of 2018
| Amyl and the Sniffers
| Best Band
| 
|-
| rowspan="4"| Music Victoria Awards of 2019
| rowspan="2"| Amyl and the Sniffers
| Best Album
| 
|-
| Best Rock/Punk Album
|  
|-
| rowspan="2"| Amyl and the Sniffers
| Best Band
| 
|-
| Best Live Act
|  
|-
| rowspan="3"| Music Victoria Awards of 2020
| rowspan="2"| Amyl and the Sniffers
| Best Band
| 
|-
| Best Live Act
| 
|-
| Amy Taylor (Amyl and The Sniffers)
| Best Musician
| 
|-
| 2021 Music Victoria Awards
| Amyl and the Sniffers
| Best Live Act
| 
|-

National Live Music Awards
The National Live Music Awards (NLMAs) are a broad recognition of Australia's diverse live industry, celebrating the success of the Australian live scene. The awards commenced in 2016.

|-
| National Live Music Awards of 2018
| Amyl and the Sniffers
| Live Hard Rock Act of the Year
| 
|-
| National Live Music Awards of 2019
| Amyl and the Sniffers
| Live Act of the Year
| 
|-

References

General

External links
 Official website

ARIA Award winners
Musical groups from Melbourne
Australian rock music groups
Pub rock musical groups
Australian punk rock groups
Australian hard rock musical groups
Australian garage rock groups
Australian glam rock musical groups
Musical groups established in 2016
2016 establishments in Australia